Borges Importadora is a Brazilian sitcom that originally aired on Comedy Central Brazil, produced by Porta dos Fundos. The plot follows four partners in a bankrupt import-export firm who turn to making viral videos to pay off debts. The series debuted March 13, 2018. Borges is the first fictional series produced by Porta dos Fundos after the beginning of their relationship with Viacom. The series was licensed by Netflix for international broadcast.

Cast
Antonio Pedro Tabet as Erasmo
Karina Ramil as Sônia
Rafael Portugal as Pablo
Thati Lopes as Rosana

References

External links
 

2018 Brazilian television series debuts
2010s Brazilian television series
Brazilian comedy television series
Brazilian workplace television series
Portuguese-language television shows